Gymnopilus arenophilus is a species of mushroom-forming fungus in the family Hymenogastraceae. It can be found in Spain and France.

See also

 List of Gymnopilus species

References

arenophilus
Fungi of Europe
Fungi described in 2005